The 1999 Anaheim Angels season involved the Angels finishing 4th in the American League west with a record of 70 wins and 92 losses.

Offseason
November 16, 1998: Jeff Juden was released by the Anaheim Angels.
November 18, 1998: Steve Decker was signed as a free agent with the Anaheim Angels.
December 7, 1998: Jack McDowell signed as a free agent with the Anaheim Angels.
December 7, 1998: Randy Velarde was signed as a free agent with the Anaheim Angels.
December 23, 1998: Tim Belcher was signed as a free agent with the Anaheim Angels.

Regular season

Season standings

Record vs. opponents

Notable transactions
April 19, 1999: Dave Silvestri was signed as a free agent with the Anaheim Angels.
July 29, 1999: Randy Velarde was traded by the Anaheim Angels with Omar Olivares to the Oakland Athletics for Jeff Davanon, Nathan Haynes, and Elvin Nina (minors).
August 6, 1999: Charlie O'Brien was released by the Anaheim Angels.

Roster

Player stats

Batting

Starters by position
Note: Pos = Position; G = Games played; AB = At bats; H = Hits; Avg. = Batting average; HR = Home runs; RBI = Runs batted in

Other batters
Note: G = Games played; AB = At bats; H = Hits; Avg. = Batting average; HR = Home runs; RBI = Runs batted in

Starting pitchers
Note: G = Games pitched; IP = Innings pitched; W = Wins; L = Losses; ERA = Earned run average; SO = Strikeouts

Other pitchers
Note: G = Games pitched; IP = Innings pitched; W = Wins; L = Losses; ERA = Earned run average; SO = Strikeouts

Relief pitchers
Note: G = Games pitched; W = Wins; L = Losses; SV = Saves; ERA = Earned run average; SO = Strikeouts

Farm system

References

1999 Anaheim Angels at Baseball Reference
1999 Anaheim Angels at Baseball Almanac

Los Angeles Angels seasons
Los
Los